Leonard Solomon Silk  (May 15, 1918 – February 10, 1995) was an American economist, author, and journalist. Silk's diverse areas of interest included global economics, unemployment, banking, and inflation. Silk wrote for Business Week between 1954 and 1969. He also wrote for the New York Times between 1970 and 1993, first writing editorials, then beginning in 1976, his own column.

Silk was born in Philadelphia, Pennsylvania, and died in Montclair, New Jersey.

Publications
As author
 The Research Revolution. New York: McGraw-Hill, 1960.
 The Economists. New York: Avon Books, 1974.
 Ethics and Profits: The Crisis of Confidence in American Business, with David Vogel. New York: Simon and Schuster, 1976.
 Economics in Plain English. Simon and Schuster, 1978.
 Ideals in Collision: The Relationship Between Business & the News Media, with Rawleigh Warner, Jr. Pittsburgh: Carnegie-Mellon University Press, 1979.
 The American Establishment, with Mark Silk. New York: Basic Books, 1980.
 Economics in the Real World. New York: Simon and Schuster, 1984.

As editor
 Capitalism, the Moving Target. New York: Praeger, 1974.
 People: From Impoverishment to Empowerment, with Üner Kirdar. New York University Press, 1995.

Awards

 1961 Gerald Loeb Award for Magazines for "The United States Invents a New Way to Grow"
 1977 Gerald Loeb Memorial Award
 1995 Gerald Loeb Lifetime Achievement Award

References

American economics writers
American male journalists
American columnists
1918 births
1995 deaths
20th-century American economists
20th-century American non-fiction writers
Writers from Philadelphia
20th-century American male writers
Economists from Pennsylvania
Gerald Loeb Lifetime Achievement Award winners
Gerald Loeb Award winners for Magazines
Gerald Loeb Memorial Award winners